Trần Đông Lương (1925–1993) was a Vietnamese painter. He was a graduate of Tô Ngọc Vân's resistance class. Later he was one of many artists who worked from studios at 65 Nguyễn Thái Học Street, Hanoi.

Works
 "Un groupe de brodeurs", 1958.
 "Portrait of a Young Woman", water colour on silk.

Sources

Vietnam Notebooks (in French).

External links
Catalogue recording sales of Tran Dong Luong's works

1925 births
1993 deaths
20th-century Vietnamese painters